is a member of the Imperial House of Japan and the eldest daughter of Norihito, Prince Takamado, and Hisako, Princess Takamado.

Biography

Childhood and education 

Princess Tsuguko was born on 8 March 1986 at Aiiku Hospital in Minami-Azabu, Tokyo. She is the first daughter of Norihito, Prince Takamado and his wife Hisako, Princess Takamado.

She graduated from the Gakushuin Primary School, Gakushuin Girls' Junior and Senior High School. After that, she entered the Faculty of Intercultural Studies of Gakushuin Women's College, but dropped out in March 2005. She attended the University of Edinburgh in Scotland from 13 April 2004 to 1 July 2008, where she studied criminal psychology and sociology, but dropped out.

In March 2013, Princess Tsuguko graduated from the School of International Liberal Studies at Waseda University with a bachelor's degree. She works at the Japan Committee for UNICEF from April 2013.

Duties and appearances 

Princess Tsuguko participates very frequently in the activities of the Imperial Family. She attends ceremonies and functions at the Imperial Palace and accompanies her mother to some other official events. In 2006, Princess Tsuguko represented the Imperial family at the Silver Wedding anniversary celebrations of Grand Duke Henri and Grand Duchess Maria Teresa of Luxembourg.

In August 2011, she attended the 28th Tokyo Disabilities Comprehensive Art Exhibition held in the main store of the Seibu Department Stores located in Ikebukuro, Toshima, Tokyo, with her mother Hisako. She was also taken in the photo with the laureate. In August 2013 she paid an official visit to Sri Lanka at the invitation of then President Mahinda Rajapaksa. In March 2015, the Princess and her mother met Crown Prince Frederik and his wife Crown Princess Mary of Denmark during their state visit to Japan and attended some official events with them, such as the opening ceremony of the exhibition "The Spiritual Greenland" at Hillside Forum in Daikanyama.

In May 2015, she visited Watari Town, Watari District, Miyagi Prefecture, which had been damaged because of the 2011 Tōhoku earthquake and tsunami, with her mother Hisako. She visited and inspected the 2nd Regional Coast Guard Headquarters of the Japan Coast Guard. After that, she also visited the Marine Rescue Miyagi, the regional organization of Marine Rescue Japan (her mother Hisako officiates as honorary president), laid flowers to the victims and gave a message of sympathy to the members.

In January 2018, she succeeded her mother as "Honorary President of the All Japan Archery Federation" and the following month, in February, she became "Honorary Chairman of the Japan Squash Association". Since then she has taken part in events organized by these organizations.

Princess Tsuguko attended the "Japan Grand Prix International Orchid and Flower Show" at the Tokyo Dome stadium, Tokyo on 15 February 2019. On 28 April 2019, she attended a ceremony to unveil the completion of the "Yume no Shima Park" archery range in a Tokyo district, and being patroness of the "All Japan Archery Federation", she gave a speech and spoke to those present. On 27 and 28 February 2021, Princess Tsuguko attended the "Kyoto Congress Youth Forum", in Kyoto. She read her opening speech. The Princess attended the "1st Global Youth Forum for a Culture of Lawfulness" in Tokyo on 9 and 10 October 2021. 

Princess Tsuguko attended the "2022 Inter-High School Archery Competition" in Marugame, Kagawa Prefecture, on 10 August 2022. She presented the prizes to the winners and spoke to them, congratulating them. On 21 September 2022, Princess Tsuguko attended the "Peace Symposium Tokyo 2022" and gave a speech to those in attendance.
Princess Tsuguko attended the state funeral of former Prime Minister Shinzo Abe on 27 September 2022 in Tokyo with her mother, Hisako, Princess Takamado. On 4 October 2022, Princess Tsuguko opened the "Yamanashi Jewelry Exhibition" at the Embassy of Oman in Tokyo, on the occasion of the 50th anniversary of the establishment of diplomatic relations between Oman and Japan. From 8 to 9 October 2022, Princess Tsuguko visited Tochigi Prefecture for the "77th National Sports Festival". On the 9th, she visited the Prefectural Museum and took part in sports-related exhibitions. The Princess attended the "2nd Global Youth Forum for a Culture of Lawfulness" in Kyoto on 3 and 4 December 2022, and gave a keynote address to those present at the opening of the event. On  5 March 2023, Princess Tsuguko attended the celebrations marking the 30th anniversary of the establishment of diplomatic relations between Croatia and Japan. The event took place at the Embassy of the Republic of Croatia in Shibuya, Tokyo.

Health 
In mid-July 2022, Princess Tsuguko tested positive for COVID-19. The Imperial Household Agency reported that she was asymptomatic and would recover at home.

Titles and styles

Tsuguko is styled as Her Imperial Highness Princess Tsuguko.

Honours

National honours
 Member 2nd Class (Peony) of the Order of the Precious Crown -

Ancestry

References

External links

Japanese princesses
1986 births
Living people
People from Tokyo
Alumni of the University of Edinburgh

Order of the Precious Crown members
20th-century Japanese women
21st-century Japanese women